A referendum on building a new airfield or replacing RMS St Helena was held in Saint Helena between 21 January and 1 February 2002. Around 72% voted in favour of the airport, although critics claimed that the referendum was slanted in favour of this option.

Background
RMS St Helena was the island's only connection with the outside world, but required replacing at an estimated cost of £26 million. The cost of the alternative option of a new airport was estimated at £50 million. The island's Executive Council initially rejected holding a referendum, but agreed to do so on 8 January 2002.

All Saint Helena citizens aged over 16 and based in Saint Helena, Ascension Island, the Falkland Islands and on board RMS St Helena were eligible to vote. Voters were given the options:
I WOULD LIKE to have an airport on St Helena, with alternative arrangements being made for shipping.
I WOULD NOT LIKE to have an airport but would like to have a replacement RMS St Helena.

Results

References

Referendums in Saint Helena
2002 referendums
2002 in Saint Helena